Fernando António (born 30 April 1899 - deceased) was a Portuguese footballer who played as a forward.

External links 
 
 

1899 births
Year of death missing
Portuguese footballers
Association football forwards
C.F. Os Belenenses players
Portugal international footballers